Der Deutsche Jugendtheaterpreis and der Deutsche Kindertheaterpreis are literary theater prizes of Germany, Jugend for Youth and Kinder for Children.
 ; 1996
 ; Kindertheaterpreis
 Rudolf Herfurtner, Waldkinder
 Special Mention ('Lobende Erwähnung')  Guy Krneta, Ursel
 ; Jugendtheaterpreis
 Oliver Bukowski, Ob so oder so
 Special Mention Ljudmila Rasumowskaja, Nach Hause
 ; 1998
 ; Kindertheaterpreis
 Ad de Bont, Die Tochter des Ganovenkönigs and Barbara Buri for  the translation
 ; Jugendtheaterpreis
 Lutz Hübner, Das Herz eines Boxers
 ; 2000
 ; Kindertheaterpreis
 Jonna Nordenskiöld, Jonna Ponna! (from Swedush by Verena Reichel)
 ; Jugendtheaterpreis
 Thomas Oberender, Nachtschwärmer
 Special Mention Lisa Rose-Cameron, no stairway to heaven
 ; 2002
 ; Kindertheaterpreis
 Kerstin Specht, Wieland
 ; Jugendtheaterpreis
 Kai Hensel, Klamms Krieg
 ; 2004
 ; Kindertheaterpreis
 Heleen Verburg, Katharina Katharina im Gänsespiel
 ; Jugendtheaterpreis
 Andri Beyeler, The killer in me is the killer in you my love
 ; 2006
 ; Kindertheaterpreis
 Ulrich Hub, An der Arche um acht
 ; Jugendtheaterpreis
 Jan Liedtke, Kamikaze Pictures
 ; 2008
 ; Kindertheaterpreis
 Katrin Lange, Unter hohem Himmel: Parzival
 ; Jugendtheaterpreis
 Daniel Danis, Kiwi and Tina Müller Bikini (Prize divided)
 ; 2010
 ; Kindertheaterpreis
 Charles Way, Verschwunden
 ; Jugendtheaterpreis
 Martin Baltscheit, Die besseren Wälder
 ; 2012
 ; Kindertheaterpreis
 Mike Kenny, Nachtgeknister (Electric Darkness)
 ; Jugendtheaterpreis
 Björn Bicker, Deportation Cast
 ; 2014
 ; Kindertheaterpreis
 Jens Raschke, Was das Nashorn sah, als es auf die andere Seite des Zauns schaute
 ; Jugendtheaterpreis
 David Greig, Monster (The Monster in the Hall)and Barbara Christ for the translation from English
 ; 2016
 ; Kindertheaterpreis
 Martin Baltscheit, Krähe und Bär oder: Die Sonne scheint für uns alle
 ; Jugendtheaterpreis
 Jörg Menke-Peitzmeyer, The Working Dead. Ein hartes Stück Arbeit
 ; 2018
 ; Kindertheaterpreis
 Fabrice Melquiot, Die Zertrennlichen, translated by Leyla-Claire Rabih, Frank Weigand
 ; Jugendtheaterpreis
 Dino Pešut, Der (vorletzte) Panda oder Die Statik, translated by Alida Bremer supported by Sonja Anders and Friederike Heller
 ; 2020
 ; Kindertheaterpreis
 Theo Fransz, Liebe Grüße oder Wohin das Leben fällt
 ; Jugendtheaterpreis
 Rabiah Hussain, Absprung (Orig. Spun)

References

German literary awards